Nawaiwaqt is an Urdu daily newspaper in Pakistan which is currently owned by Majid Nizami Trust. It was launched on March 23, 1940, under the leadership of Hameed Nizami (3 Oct 1915-22 Feb 1962). Hameed Nizami was the founder of this newspaper. His younger brother Majid Nizami (3 April 1928 – 26 July 2014) was the chief editor and publisher of Nawa-i-Waqt Group of Publications until he died in 2014 and then this group became the property of Majid Nizami Trust created by Majid Nizami himself in his lifetime. In 2016, Rameeza (adopted daughter of Majid Nizami) and actual daughter of Mian Arif and Ghazala Arif elected as the Managing Director of Nawa-i-Waqt Group of Publications by the Trustees of Majid Nizami Trust and was also elected as the Senior Vice President of All Pakistan Newspapers Society (APNS).

History
Nawa-i-Waqt by Majid Nizami Trust first came out on March 23, 1940, as a fortnightly periodical. It passionately supported the All India Muslim League. In those days it had a pro-American and anti-communist stance. The editors were Afaq Hussain Johar, a student of Islamia College, and Shabbar Hasan, a student of King Edward Medical University. They were influenced by a nationalist periodical Aligarh Opinion, which was launched by Syed Sibte Hassan, Khwaja Ahmad Abbas and Dr. Ashraf who were close friends of Dr. Shabbar Hasan. On December 15, 1942 the fortnightly was turned into a weekly and finally into a daily on July 19, 1944.

The group which is owned by Majid Nizami Trust has several publications including the flagship Nawa-i-Waqt newspaper in Urdu and The Nation newspaper in English, Nida-i-Millat, a family magazine, and the monthly children's magazine, Phool.

This newspaper had supported the Pakistan Movement for the creation of Pakistan.

Waqt News
Nawa-i-Waqt Group by Majid Nizmai Trust has also entered the electronic broadcast media with a 24-hour news and entertainment channel Waqt News in 2007. This channel is completely closed down in 2018.

Staff and columnists
Its staff include Malik Fida-ur-Rehman, Lt. Gen. Abdul Qayyum (retired), Saeed Aasi, Ajmal Niazi, Muhammad Usman Ajmeri(Late), Taiba Zia Cheema, Nazeer Ahmad Ghazi, Dr. Syed Mehboob, Fazal Hussain Awan, Dr. Akhtar Shumaar, Bushra Rahman, Qayyum Nizami, Professor Zahoor Ahmad Azhar, Aseer Ahmed, Sikander Baloch, Javed Siddique and Lt. Col. (R) Abdul Razaque Bugti. Nadeem Basra

Ahmad Kamal Nizami, shareholder of Nawaiwaqt group, son of Bashir Nizami and nephew of Hameed Nizami and Majid Nizmai.

Ahmad Jamal Nizami, Trustee of Majeed Nizami Trust.

Mujahid Hussain Syed, Trustee of Majid Nizami Trust.(Brother of Mushahid Hussain Syed, Member of Senate of Pakistan)

Azam Badar, Trustee/ Trust Secretary of Majid Nizami Trust.
He have also served the group as Chief Accountant, Chief Operating Officer, Director Finance and Company Secretary for 28 years.

Arif Nizami (son of the newspaper founder Hameed Nizami) was a long-time editor of the English-language daily newspaper The Nation but resigned due to differences with his uncle Majid Nizami before his uncle's death in 2014.

Nawa-i-Waqt Group of Publications by Majid Nizami Trust
Magazines and newspapers published by this company are:
 Phool - monthly magazine for children in Urdu language
  Family Magazine - Weekly for Women in Urdu language
 Nida-i-Millat - a weekly magazine in Urdu language
 The Nation - A daily English newspaper from Lahore, Pakistan

See also
 Waqt News TV Channel
List of news channels in Pakistan

References

1940 establishments in India
Daily newspapers published in Pakistan
Mass media in Lahore
Newspapers established in 1940
Urdu-language newspapers published in Pakistan